Gabriela Ņikitina (born 2 June 1994) is a swimmer from Latvia. She has qualified for 2012 Summer Olympics and has participated at 2011 FINA World Championships at Shanghai, China. Ņikitina was born in Riga, Latvia.

She represented Latvia at the 2019 World Aquatics Championships held in Gwangju, South Korea. She competed in the women's 50 metre freestyle and women's 50 metre butterfly events. In both events she did not advance to compete in the semi-finals.

References

External links
 
 
 

1994 births
Living people
Latvian female butterfly swimmers
Olympic swimmers of Latvia
Swimmers at the 2012 Summer Olympics
Swimmers at the 2010 Summer Youth Olympics
Sportspeople from Riga
Latvian female freestyle swimmers
21st-century Latvian women